= 1920 Cork Intermediate Hurling Championship =

Irish hurling competition

The 1920 Cork Intermediate Hurling Championship was the 12th staging of the Cork Intermediate Hurling Championship since its establishment by the Cork County Board.

The championship was unfinished.
